Pazarköy (literally “market village”) is a village in Yenice District of Çanakkale Province, Turkey. Its population is 1,340 (2021). It was initially founded by the ancient Greeks and was called Argyria (Αργυρία). Pazarköy is situated to the east of Gönen creek and to the north of Kaz Mountains (Ida Mountains of the antiquity). Between 1973 and the 2013 reorganisation, it was a town (belde). The main agricultural product is paprika.

References

Villages in Yenice District, Çanakkale